Brad Mehldau is an American jazz pianist. He first recorded in 1991, for saxophonist Christopher Hollyday's The Natural Moment. He has recorded more than forty albums as leader or co-leader, many more as a sideman, and for several soundtracks.

Discography
An asterisk (*) after the year indicates that it is the year of release.

As leader/co-leader
Mehldau plays piano on all albums, unless otherwise indicated.

Promotional album (not for sale): Deregulating Jazz (trio, with Larry Grenadier (bass), Jorge Rossy (drums)) (released 2000, Warner Bros.)

Compilation containing some additional material: The Art of the Trio: Recordings 1996–2001 (Nonesuch)

As sideman

Soundtracks
Vanya on 42nd Street (1994)
Midnight in the Garden of Good and Evil (1997)
Eyes Wide Shut (1999)
Space Cowboys (2000)
The Million Dollar Hotel (2000)
Ma femme est une actrice (2001)
Ils se marièrent et eurent beaucoup d'enfants (2004)
Mon chien stupide (2019)

Sources:

References

Discographies of American artists
Jazz discographies